Michael Heiss (April 12, 1818 – March 26, 1890) was a German-born prelate of the Roman Catholic Church who served as  the first bishop of the Diocese of La Crosse in Wisconsin (1868–1880) and the second archbishop of the Archdiocese of Milwaukee in Wisconsin (1881–1890).

Biography

Early years
Michael Heiss was born on April 12, 1818, in Pfahldorf in the Kingdom of Bavaria (now part of present-day Kipfenberg, Germany), to Joseph and Gertrude (née Frei) Heiss. He received confirmation when he was only two years old because his parents feared they would be without a bishop for a prolonged period of time due to tension between church and state. Heiss entered a Latin school at age 9, and later graduated from the gymnasium of Neuburg, Bavaria, in 1835.

Heiss then entered the University of Munich, where he originally studied law but switched to theology after deciding to join the priesthood. He completed his studies at the ecclesiastical seminary in Eichstätt, Bavaria.

Ordination and ministry
Heiss was ordained a priest for the Diocese of Louisville by Bishop Karl-August von Reisach on October 18, 1840. Because, at age 22, he was younger than the age requirement for ordination, he was granted a dispensation by Pope Gregory XVI. Heiss briefly served as a curate in Raitenbuch, Bavaria and afterwards in Pleinfeld, Bavaria.

In December 1842, Heiss emigrated to the United States, where he became pastor of Mother of God Parish in Covington, Kentucky. He remained in Covington until 1844, when he went to Milwaukee, Wisconsin to serve as secretary to Archbishop John Henni in the Archdiocese of Milwaukee. Heiss erected St. Mary's Parish in Milwaukee, and served as its first pastor with his charge extending over an area of 52 square miles. In 1856, he was named the first rector of St. Francis Seminary, serving for 12 years.

Bishop of La Crosse
The Diocese of La Crosse was erected in 1868 as suffragan diocese to the Archdiocese of Milwaukee. Heiss was appointed its first bishop on March 3, 1868 by Pope Pius IX.  Heiss was consecrated on September 6, 1868 by Archbishop John Martin Henni. After his consecration, Heiss hired architect Charles I. Ross to design St. Joseph Cathedral. The new parish had already been planned to serve the German speaking Catholics of La Crosse and ease over-crowding at St. Mary's. In 1870, Heiss traveled to Rome to attend the First Vatican Council.

In 1871, at Heiss' request, the Franciscan Sisters of Perpetual Adoration relocated their motherhouse, St. Rose of Viterbo Convent, to La Crosse. The sisters had previously worked with Heiss, managing the household responsibilities at Saint Francis de Sales Seminary. The convent was initially built both as the administrative center of the congregation and also as a secondary school for girls.
During his twelve years as bishop, he built several churches, including the cathedral, and the episcopal residence.

Coadjutor Archbishop and Archbishop of Milwaukee
On March 14, 1880, Heiss was appointed coadjutor archbishop of the Archdiocese of Milwaukee by Pope Leo XIII. On September 7, 1881, he succeeded Archbishop John Henni on his death as archbishop of Milwaukee. Heiss was an opponent of the Americanist heresy.

Michael Heiss died in La Crosse, Wisconsin, on March 26, 1890, at age 71.  He was buried in St. Francis, Wisconsin, in a chapel at St. Francis de Sales Seminary.

See also

 Catholic Church in the United States
 Historical list of the Catholic bishops of the United States
 List of Catholic bishops of the United States
 Lists of patriarchs, archbishops, and bishops

References

External links
Archbishop Michael Heiss at the Archdiocese of Milwaukee
 

1818 births
1890 deaths
19th-century Roman Catholic bishops in the United States
Roman Catholic archbishops of Milwaukee
Burials in Wisconsin
German emigrants to the United States
German Roman Catholic bishops in North America
Roman Catholic bishops of La Crosse
Religious leaders from Wisconsin